The Doheny Plaza is a high-rise residential building in West Hollywood, California. It was designed in the modernist architectural style. When it was built by Julian Weinstock in 1963, it was the first high-rise residential building in Los Angeles. By 1966, Weinstock gave a speech about it at the Biltmore Hotel.

References

Buildings and structures in West Hollywood, California
Residential buildings completed in 1963
Modernist architecture in California
Skyscrapers in California
Residential skyscrapers in California